Cephonodes santome is a moth species of the family Sphingidae. It is known from São Tomé Island.

References

santome
Moths described in 2002
Endemic moths of São Tomé and Príncipe
Fauna of São Tomé Island